Mizuki is both a Japanese surname (みずき, ミズキ) and a unisex Japanese given name. Notable people with the name include:

Surname
Alisa Mizuki, a J-pop singer and actress
Hakase Mizuki, Japanese manga artist
Ichirou Mizuki, an actor, voice actor and singer
Itagaki Mizuki, a Japanese actor and singer from EBiDAN's five-member vocal dance unit M!LK
Joh Mizuki, Japanese actor
Kaoru Mizuki, Japanese actress
Nana Mizuki, a Japanese voice actress and singer
Shigeru Mizuki, a Japanese manga artist and author of Ge Ge Ge no Kitaro
Raika Mizuki, American-born Korean Vtuber

Given name
Mizuki, a Japanese singer and member of Shiritsu Ebisu Chugaku
, Japanese footballer
Mizuki Fukumura, (譜久村 聖, born 1996) Japanese pop singer, Morning Musume member
Mizuki Hamada, (賓田 水輝, born 1990) American-born Japanese football defender
, Japanese footballer
Mizuki Inoue, (井上 水樹, born 1994) Japanese female kickboxer and mixed martial artist
Mizuki Kaminade, (上撫 瑞希, born 1995) Japanese professional wrestler
Mizuki Kawashita, (河下 水希, born 1971) a manga and dōjinshi artist
Mizuki Kubodera, (久保寺 水紀, born 1986) beauty pageant contestant who represented Japan in Miss World 2008
Mizuki Noguchi, (野口みずき, born 1978) a Japanese female long-distance track and field athlete
Mizuki Ogawa (小川美月, aka Léa, born 1995), Japanese K-Pop idol, former member of Skarf & current member of Secret Number
, Japanese long distance runner
Mizuki Watanabe (Miz), (渡辺みづき, born 1981) a Japanese pop/rock singer
Mizuki Yamamoto, (山本美月, born 1991) Japanese actress and model
Mizuki Yamashita (山下美月, born 1999), Japanese idol and actress

Fictional characters 
 Captain Mizuki, in the manga One Punch Man
 Hajime Mizuki, in the character The Prince Of Tennis
 Kaho Mizuki, in the anime and manga Cardcaptor Sakura
 Karen Mizuki, a character in the Super Sentai series J.A.K.Q. Dengekitai
 Mizuki, the main character in the manga of the same name by Nao Yazawa.
 Mizuki, a character in the manga Yumekui Kenbun
 Mizuki, a minor antagonist in the beginning of the manga/anime series Naruto
 Mizuki, an enemy character in the video game The Punisher
 Mizuki Ashiya, a character in the shōjo manga Hana-Kimi
 Mizuki Himeji, a character in the manga and anime Baka and Test
 Mizuki Inaba, a character in the manga and anime Full Metal Panic!
 Mizuki Mochizuki, a character in the shōjo manga Kagen no Tsuki
 Mizuki Rashojin, a character in the video game series Samurai Shodown
 Mizuki, a character in the manga and anime series Kamisama Hajimemashita
 Mizuki, a character from the BL visual novel DRAMAtical Murder
 Mizuki Kanzaki, a main character in the anime series Aikatsu!
 Mizuki Akabayashi, a character from the Durarara! light novel series
Mizuki Shibata, a character in The Irregular at Magic High School light novel series
 Mizuki, the main character of the Kiyoshi Kurosawa film Journey to the Shore
 Mizuki Akiyama, a character from the mobile game Hatsune Miku: Colorful Stage!
 Mizuki Okiura, a character from the video game AI: The Somnium Files

See also
Mizuki Station
Mizuki Castle

Japanese unisex given names
Japanese-language surnames